Daily Kawish is a Sindhi-language daily newspaper in Pakistan.

History
The newspaper was founded in 1990 and is part of the Kawish Group of Publication. Muhammad Aslam Kazi is the newspaper's founder. It is the only newspaper that is published in the Sindhi language on a large scale.

See also 
 Hayat Ali Shah Bukhari, worked as assistant editor
 Sindhi-language media

References

Sindhi-language newspapers
1990 establishments in Pakistan